Zephyrogomphus longipositor is a species of dragonfly in the family Gomphidae, 
known as the rainforest hunter. 
It inhabits rainforest streams and pools in northeast Queensland, Australia.

Zephyrogomphus longipositor is a medium-sized, dark brown dragonfly with brown and greenish yellow markings.

Gallery

See also
 List of Odonata species of Australia

References

Gomphidae
Odonata of Australia
Endemic fauna of Australia
Taxa named by J.A.L. (Tony) Watson
Insects described in 1991